Firat is a Kurdish name. It is also a latinized version of Fırat, the Turkish equivalent.

Notable persons with that name include:

Firat Arslan (born 1970), German boxer of Turkish descent
Firat Ayverdi (born 1990), Kurdish film actor
Firat Cewerî (born 1959), Kurdish writer, translator and journalist
Firat Ezel Filiz (born 1988), Turkish volleyball player

See also
Fırat (disambiguation)